Aanderaa is a Norwegian surname. Notable people with the surname include:

Johannes Aanderaa (1927–1991), Norwegian librarian, theatre critic, publisher and civil servant
Stål Aanderaa (born 1931), Norwegian mathematician
Aanderaa–Karp–Rosenberg conjecture

Norwegian-language surnames